Megatibicen resh, the resh cicada or western dusk singing cicada, is a species of cicada in the family Cicadidae, found in North America.

References

Further reading

 
 

Cicadas
Insects described in 1852